Arthurs galaxias (Paragalaxias mesotes) is a species of fish in the family Galaxiidae. It is endemic to Tasmania in Australia.

It is found at Arthurs Lake (Tasmania), Lake Woods and Lake River near Woods Lake dam, in the Central Highlands (Tasmania).

It is one of the species considered in the 2006 ''Threatened Tasmanian Galaxiidae recovery programme.

See also 
 Paragalaxias eleotroides
 Pedder galaxias

References

External links
 Fishes of Australia : Paragalaxias mesotes

Paragalaxias
Vulnerable fauna of Australia
Fish described in 1978
Taxonomy articles created by Polbot